Bakhtajerd (also Romanized as Bakhtājerd; also known as Bakhlagird, Bakhlājerd, and Baxtâjerd) is a village in Bakhtajerd Rural District, in the Central District of Darab County, Fars Province, Iran. At the 2016 census, its population was 889, in 277 families.

References 

Populated places in Darab County